Rincon Arroyo is a tributary stream or arroyo to the Rio Grande, in Doña Ana County, New Mexico.

References 

Bodies of water of Doña Ana County, New Mexico
Bodies of water of Sierra County, New Mexico
Tributaries of the Rio Grande